Heath Hayes and Wimblebury is a civil parish in the district of Cannock Chase, Staffordshire, England.  The parish contains two listed buildings that are recorded in the National Heritage List for England.  Both the listed buildings are designated at Grade II, the lowest of the three grades, which is applied to "buildings of national importance and special interest".  The parish is to the east of Cannock, and contains the former villages of Heath Hayes and Wimblebury, which have grown and merged.  The parish is mainly residential, and the listed buildings consist of a house and a farmhouse now used for other purposes.


Buildings

References

Citations

Sources

Lists of listed buildings in Staffordshire